Reynaldo Castro (born 14 July 1961) is a Dominican Republic diver. He competed at the 1980 Summer Olympics and the 1984 Summer Olympics. In his teens, he attended high school in Michigan where in 1978 and 1979 he became Michigan State High School Diving Champion. After high school, he attended the University of Nebraska-Lincoln.

References

1961 births
Living people
Dominican Republic male divers
Olympic divers of the Dominican Republic
Divers at the 1980 Summer Olympics
Divers at the 1984 Summer Olympics
Place of birth missing (living people)